This is a list of models of the Ford Taurus. The Taurus has been in production since the 1986 model year; its first run was as a mid-size sedan on the Ford DN5 platform, and its second and current production run has been as a full-size sedan on the Ford D3 platform.

First generation

Second generation

Third generation

1996–1997

1998–1999

Fourth generation

Fifth generation

Sixth generation

Ford Taurus